Scarborough—Rouge River was a federal electoral district in Ontario, Canada, that has been represented in the House of Commons of Canada between 1988 and 2015. However, as of the Fall 2015 federal election, part of this riding has been combined with the south-western part of the old riding Pickering—Scarborough East.

The riding covered the northeast part of the Scarborough part of Toronto.  It stretched from Highway 401 in the south to Steeles Avenue in the north.  In the east it ended at the border with Pickering and in the west at Midland north of Finch and Brimley south of Finch.

Scarborough—Rouge River  has the highest percentage of visible minorities in all electoral districts (89.7%) and the lowest percentage of White Caucasians (10.1%).
Chinese make up 30.8%, South Asian 32.8% (all South Asian countries), Black 10.7%, White 8.7%
Tamil is the mother tongue for 13.2% of the population, which is the highest such percentage for that language among all ridings; likewise for Tamil as a home language (10.5%). 13.6% of the population is Hindu, the 2nd highest in Canada after Brampton East.

In the 2011 federal election, the NDP were elected for the first time. The riding was abolished before the 2015 election. The western portion, along with most of its population, became part of Scarborough North, while the eastern portion became Scarborough—Rouge Park.

Geography

Scarborough—Rouge River consists of the part of the City of Toronto bounded on the north and east by the city limits, on the west by Midland Avenue, and on the south by a line drawn from the east city limit west along Finch Avenue East, south along Meadowvale Road, west along Sheppard Avenue East, south along Morningside Avenue, west along Highway 401, north along Brimley Road, and west along Finch Avenue East to Midland Avenue.

History
The riding was created in 1987 from part of York—Scarborough riding.

It initially consisted of the part of the City of Scarborough. It was bounded on the north and east by the city limits, and on the south and west by a line drawn southwest from the eastern city limit along Highway 401 and Kingston Road, west along Highland Creek, north along Morningside Avenue, west along Ellesmere Road and north along the Canadian National Railway line to the northern city limit.

In 1996, it was redefined to be bounded on the north and east by the city limits, on the west by the Canadian National Railway situated immediately west of Midland Avenue, and on the south by a line drawn from west to east along Highway 401, north along Conlins Road, and east along Sheppard Avenue East and Twyn Rivers Drive to the east city limits.

In 2003, it was given its current boundaries as described above.

Following the 2012 federal electoral boundaries redistribution, the riding was split between Scarborough North and Scarborough—Rouge Park.

Members of Parliament

This riding has elected the following Members of Parliament:

Election results

Note: Conservative vote is compared to the total of the Canadian Alliance vote and Progressive Conservative vote in 2000 election.

	
Note: Canadian Alliance vote is compared to the Reform vote in 1997 election.

See also
 List of Canadian federal electoral districts
 Past Canadian electoral districts

References

Riding history from the Library of Parliament
 2011 results from Elections Canada
 Campaign expense data from Elections Canada

Notes

Federal electoral districts of Toronto
Former federal electoral districts of Ontario
Scarborough, Toronto